Dempster Street station could refer to:

 Dempster–Skokie station, a rapid transit station in Skokie, Illinois
 Dempster Street station (C&NW), a former Chicago and North Western Railway station in Evanston, Illinois